Mohib Banda is a village and union council in Mardan District of Khyber Pakhtunkhwa.
On the Eastern side the village extends up to the Police Station near western River of village along with Ghazi Baba grave yard (Grave yards is 202343 sq/m) north-east. On the western side the village extends up to the western river bank. North extent is the boundary of Zande village and south it extends almost 3 km from the village centre.

In 15-16 Century there, was a final blow to the KPK by Sikhs. After the fall of Nowshera the tribes of Hoti Mardan assembled under the leadership of Syed Khwaja Noor also known as Mian Khwaja Noor and Ghazi Baba to fight Sikhs. On the day of this skirmish across the Kalpani River running through Hoti Mardan the local tribes of an Lashkar Khel took money from Sikhs commanders. And when Ghazi Baba and his immediate friends went to the battle field in the morning, there was no fighter except them. At this moment the elders of Lashkar Khel came and told them as what has happened and that they should put their arms down as fighting the Sikhs was suicidal. However, Ghazi Baba and his friends fought bravely and lost their lives.

References

Union councils of Mardan District
Populated places in Mardan District